The professional sabre competition at the 1900 Summer Olympics involved 27 fencers from 7 nations. It was held from 23 to 27 June at the Tuileries Garden. The event was won by Antonio Conte of Italy, with that nation also receiving second place with Italo Santelli. Austria's Milan Neralić finished third.

Background 

Fencing was the only sport that had professional competitions at the Olympics in 1900 and 1904. A professional foil event was held in 1900, with épée and sabre joining in 1904. The professional events were not held again afterwards (excepting the 1906 Intercalated Games, so this was the only time that masters sabre was contested.

Competition format 

The event used a three-round format: quarterfinals, semifinals, and a final. Each round consisted of pool play. For the quarterfinals, the fencers were divided into 4 pools of 6 of 7 fencers each; the top four fencers in each pool advanced to the semifinals. The semifinals had the 16 men compete in 2 pools of 8, with the top 4 in each pool advancing to an 8-man final.

The actual competition format within pools is not entirely clear. The pool composition in the quarterfinals is unknown.

Schedule

Results

Quarterfinals 

The first round was held on 23 June. There were four pools, with the top four fencers advancing to the semifinals from each pool.

Semifinals 

The 16 fencers were divided into 2 pools of 8 each, playing round-robin tournaments on 25 and 26 June. The top four in each pool advanced to the final.

Semifinal A

Semifinal B

Final 

The final was held on 27 June, with a round-robin among the final 8 fencers. Ties were broken by an extra bout.

 Barrage for 4th place

 Barrage for 6th place

Results summary

References 

Fencing at the 1900 Summer Olympics